St Mary's Church is a Syro-Malabar Catholic church in Vendore, Thrissur district, Kerala, India. It is famous in the patronage of Our lady Mother Mary and belongs to Archdiocese of Thrissur.

Vendore Parish is Famous by name Vendore Amma

According to latest information almost 1063 Christian families are in Parish.

History

The history of Vendore Church begins in 1923. Earlier Vendore family members were part of Pudukkad Parish. After 1923 the Christian family members in Vendore grouped together and they needed a Parish in their location. As per the discussion came in the meeting held, some selected persons meet Bishop in Archdiocese of Thrissur. And finally Bishop allows a new Parish in 1924. Four Manjaly Family members donated the place for the parish in the name of Our lady Mother Mary. The statue in the church was imported from foreign country. The miraculous statue in which Mother Mary carrying baby Jesus Christ in her hands was crafted in woods was brought from Kochi via train to Pudukad Railway Station and then in decorated bullock cart. St Mary's Church, Vendore was Blessed in 1927 with 52 families.

Festivals
Vendore celebrates two major feasts in a calendar year. The feast of Mother Mary on September 
and feast of Saint Sebastian in month on January.

Mass Timing

 Sunday: 05:45am, 07:00am,10:30am, 05:30pm
 Monday to Friday: 05:45am, 07:00am
 Saturday: 06:30am, 05:30pm

Convent

Provincial council granted and bought a house near the parish church, raised to a convent on 28 May 1987 by Mar Joseph Kundukulam. By the plead from parishioners, the convent is named as St. Mary's FC Convert

Religious Organization

 Kerala Catholic Youth Movement
 CLC
 Jesus Youth

References

External links
Official Parish Website 
വെണ്ടോർ പള്ളി നിർമിച്ചു നൽകുന്ന വീടുകളുടെ താക്കോൽദാനം | ദീപിക 
 വെണ്ടോർ പള്ളിയിൽ തിരുനാൾ ആഘോഷം | മനോരമ 2017 
Parish History

Syro-Malabar Catholic church buildings
Eastern Catholic churches in Kerala
Churches in Thrissur
Roman Catholic churches completed in 1927
20th-century Roman Catholic church buildings in India